Refuge du Sélé is a refuge in the Alps.

References
http://www.tonyturton.com/mountains/ecrins05/refuges.html

Mountain huts in the Alps
Mountain huts in France